Clear Networks is a licensed Australian telecommunications carrier and ISP that provides NBN Fibre, Wireless, NBN Sky Muster Satellite services, and legacy IPSTAR Satellite services. Clear Networks is headquartered in Blackburn North, Victoria.

History 
Clear Networks was founded in 2004 in Melbourne, Victoria as a sister company of Day3, via the acquisition of Canberra-based Regional Broadband Services (RBBS). In April 2016, Clear Networks commenced selling NBN Sky Muster Satellite services as one of seven initial resellers.

References

External links
 
 Clear Networks (Clear Broadband) discussion -  Wireless ISPs -  Whirlpool Forums

Internet service providers of Australia
Privately held companies of Australia
Telecommunications companies established in 2004